The Pernicious Enigma is the second studio album by the British doom metal band Esoteric. It was released in 1997 through Aesthetic Death Records. The Pernicious Enigma comprises two discs with a total running time of an hour and 55 minutes.

The album has received much praise since its release, and is seen as one of the band's best works. It has been cited to have helped influence the funeral doom and death-doom genres. The album would later be remastered and released as a three-disc vinyl set in 2016, limited to only 600 copies. A CD edition based on this remaster was issued in 2018.

Production
The album was recorded at Rich Bitch Studios during the month of July 1996 and was mixed in October the same year, starting on the 9th and ending on the 15th. Mixing duties were held by the band itself, while the production and engineering featured the band being assisted by Steve Wilson. Anthony Brewer was hired as a session drummer to record on a few tracks on the album. The album was mastered at Strype Audio Studios, Oslo, Norway by Tom Kvalsvoll. The track "NOXBC9701040" was improvised in studio on 21 July 1996.

For the remaster, the album was mixed and mastered by Greg Chandler in 2015. Kevin Metcalfe also helped cut the lacquer used for the record manufacturing for the album at Soundmasters, London, United Kingdom.

Track listing

Credits
Original 1997 edition personnel
 Bryan Beck – bass guitar, and bass synth
 Gordon Bicknell – lead guitar, effects, synth
 Greg Chandler – vocals, effects
 Simon Phillips – lead guitar, effects, samples
 Steve Peters – guitar, samples
 Anthony Brewer – session drums ("Creation (Through Destruction)", "Dominion of Slaves", "Allegiance", "A Worthless Dream", and "Passing through Matter")
 Steve Wilson - engineering, mixing
 Tom Kvalsvoll - mastering

Additional 2016 remaster personnel
Kevin Metcalfe - vinyl master cutting
Mauro Berchi - layout
Greg Chandler - mastering

References

External links
The Pernicious Enigma on Discogs
The Pernicious Enigma on Bandcamp

1997 albums
Esoteric (band) albums